Acraea igati is a butterfly in the family Nymphalidae. It is found on Madagascar and the Comoros.

Description

Very similar to Acraea dammii but the hindwing in cellule 7 with a large black spot directly before the spot in 6, but without other spots in 7. Basal area of the wings in the ochre-yellow to brown-yellow, in the female whitish.

Biology
The habitat consists of forests.

Taxonomy
It is a member of the Acraea terpsicore species group-   but see also Pierre & Bernaud, 2014

References

External links

Images representing Acraea igati at Bold

Butterflies described in 1833
igati